David Andrew Williams (born August 25, 1967) is an American former ice hockey player who played in the National Hockey League for the San Jose Sharks and the Mighty Ducks of Anaheim. Williams was drafted 234th overall by the New Jersey Devils in the 1985 NHL Entry Draft and played 173 regular season games in the NHL, scoring a total of 11 goals and 53 assists for 64 points and collecting 157 penalty minutes. 

Prior to turning pro, Williams played four seasons at Dartmouth College in ECAC Hockey, serving as team captain at the end of his career there.  At Dartmouth, Williams was an All American player. He also played varsity hockey for Choate Rosemary Hall a prep school in Wallingford, Connecticut, and Chatham Township High School in Chatham Township, New Jersey. Williams was the first New Jersey-raised player to play in the NHL. Internationally Williams played for the American national team at two World Championships.

At Choate, Williams was also an All New England baseball player, but chose hockey and did not continue playing baseball.

Williams was elected to the New Jersey High School Ice Hockey Hall of Fame in 2012 for his achievements at all levels of ice hockey.

Career statistics

Regular season and playoffs

International

Awards and honors

References

External links

1967 births
American men's ice hockey defensemen
Chatham High School (New Jersey) alumni
Cincinnati Cyclones (IHL) players
Dartmouth Big Green men's ice hockey players
Detroit Vipers players
Ice hockey players from New Jersey
Kansas City Blades players
Knoxville Cherokees players
Living people
Mighty Ducks of Anaheim players
Muskegon Lumberjacks players
New Jersey Devils draft picks
Sportspeople from Plainfield, New Jersey
San Diego Gulls (IHL) players
San Jose Sharks players
Worcester IceCats players